Samuel Robinson may refer to:
Samuel Robinson (1666–1729), member of Parliament for Cricklade, England
Samuel Robinson (politician) (1738–1813), Vermont political and military leader
Samuel Robinson (industrialist) (1794–1884), English industrialist and Persian scholar
Samuel Robinson (businessman) (1865–1958), American founder of Acme Markets
Colonel Samuel Robinson (American developer),1920s resort developer in Boca Chica
Sir Samuel Robinson (sea captain) (1870–1958), British-Canadian ocean liner captain
Samuel Robinson (footballer) (1878–?), English footballer
Samuel Murray Robinson (1882–1972), U.S. Navy admiral
Sam Robinson (basketball) (born 1948), basketball player
Sam Robinson (cricketer) (born 1976), Bermudian cricketer
Samuel Abiola Robinson (born 1998), Nigerian actor
Sammy Robinson (born 2002), English footballer

See also
 Robinson (name)